The North Valley Christian Academy (NVCA) is a private, independent Lutheran school located in north Phoenix Arizona, United States.

NVCA is affiliated with the Lutheran Church–Missouri Synod system of schools throughout the U.S. The academy is accredited by National Lutheran School Accreditation (NLSA), Association of Christian Schools International (ACSI), and Cognia.

NVCA operates a preschool, lower school, middle school, high school, and international student program.

Nate Kretzmann was the founding Executive Director of the school.

History 
Founded in 2010, NVCA is a 501(c)(3), non-profit, education organization.  The school is operated and governed independently by an elected board of directors.

References

External links 
 

Private elementary schools in Arizona
Private middle schools in Arizona
Lutheran schools in Arizona
Educational institutions established in 2011
Schools affiliated with the Lutheran Church–Missouri Synod
Schools in Phoenix, Arizona
2011 establishments in Arizona